The New York Islanders are a professional ice hockey team based in Long Island. They are members of the Metropolitan Division in the Eastern Conference of the National Hockey League (NHL). The franchise has been a part of the NHL since their inception in 1972, which is also the first year they participated in the annual NHL Entry Draft, where participating teams select newly eligible players in a predetermined order. They have chosen 459 players over 52 drafts, including the nine Supplemental Drafts, which took place in the NHL from 1986 to 1994 for players in American colleges.

The NHL Entry Draft eligibility requires players to have turned 18 years old by September 15 in the year the draft is held, excluding players older than 20 years old before December 31 of that same year, the latter not applying to non-North American players. The draft order is determined by the previous season's order of finish: non-playoff teams draft first in order of placement in the standings, followed by teams that competed in the post-season whose order is determined by the Stanley Cup playoffs results. Once the regular season is over, a weighted lottery is held for the 14 teams who miss the playoffs, giving teams the opportunity to move up to a higher pick including the first overall selection. From 1995 to 2012, a team that won the lottery could only move up a maximum of four picks, preventing some teams from winning the top selection regardless of winning the lottery. During that time, the Islanders won the lottery twice, receiving the top selection both times (2000 and 2009). The team finished last in the league standings in the 2000–01 season, but picked second in the draft after the Atlanta Thrashers won the lottery.

The Islanders have selected first overall four times, including their first season participating in the draft (1972) when they selected Billy Harris, as well as 1973 (Denis Potvin), 2000 (Rick DiPietro), and 2009 (John Tavares). Harris played with the Islanders for eight seasons before being traded to the Los Angeles Kings, while Potvin and DiPietro spent their entire NHL careers with the Islanders. Tavares was with the team from 2009 when he was drafted and served as their team captain until 2018 when he signed with the Toronto Maple Leafs during Unrestricted Free Agency. Currently Anders Lee serves as the captain. Only two players, Potvin and Bryan Trottier (1974), have played over 1000 games with the Islanders, though eight others have played at least 1000 games in the NHL. Five draft picks have gone on to be inducted into the Hockey Hall of Fame: Potvin, Clark Gillies (1974), Trottier, Mike Bossy (1977), and Pat LaFontaine (1983). All, except LaFontaine, along with Bob Nystrom (1972) have had their uniform number retired by the team.

Key
 Spent entire NHL career with the Islanders
() Inducted into the Hockey Hall of Fame
() Number retired by the Islanders

Draft picks
Statistics are complete as of the 2021–22 NHL season and show each player's career regular season totals in the NHL. Wins, losses, ties, overtime losses and goals against average apply to goaltenders and are used only for players at that position.

See also
List of New York Islanders players
1972 NHL Expansion Draft

References

 
draft picks
New York Islanders